Charleston is a city in Franklin County, Arkansas, United States, and along with Ozark is one of the two county seats of Franklin County. It is part of the Fort Smith, Arkansas-Oklahoma Metropolitan Statistical Area. The population was 2,494 at the 2010 census, down from 2,965 in 2000.

History
Charleston was platted in 1870.

In 1954, Charleston was the first school district in the former Confederate States to implement school integration in response to Brown v. Board of Education. On July 27, 1954, the school board, including President Howard Madison Orsburn, George Hairston, Archibald Schaffer, Herbert Shumate, and Homer Keith, unanimously voted to "disband the Colored School and admit the Colored children into the grade and high school when classes open for the fall semester." Accordingly, when the schools opened on August 23, 11 black children were in attendance alongside 480 whites. School Superintendent Woodie Haynes made an agreement with the local press not to cover the event, and stonewalled any outside reporters that asked questions. The decision to integrate had financial benefits, as the district had been paying a considerable sum to transport black high school students to Fort Smith, and were able to close the old Rosenwald school. During the Civil Rights era, the city was among a few Southern cities which surprisingly showed little resistance to integration. Charleston suffered some discrimination from other schools and the state; many schools refused to play football against them and the band was denied the opportunity to play in some band competitions. In 1961, the first two black students to graduate from Charleston were Barbara (Williams) Dotson and Joe Ferguson.

Geography
Charleston is in southwestern Franklin County, along Arkansas Highway 22, which leads east  to Ratcliff and west  to Fort Smith.

Demographics

2020 census

As of the 2020 United States census, there were 2,588 people, 997 households, and 639 families residing in the city.

2000 census
As of the census of 2000, there were 2,965 people, 1,201 households, and 815 families residing in the city. The racial makeup of the city was 95.58% White, 0.07% Black or African American, 0.64% Native American, 0.34% Asian, 1.48% from other races, and 1.89% from two or more races.  2.06% of the population were Hispanic or Latino of any race.

There were 1,201 households, out of which 31.7% had children under the age of 18 living with them, 52.3% were married couples living together, 11.9% had a female householder with no husband present, and 32.1% were non-families. 29.2% of all households were made up of individuals, and 14.7% had someone living alone who was 65 years of age or older.  The average household size was 2.40 and the average family size was 2.96.

In the city, the population was spread out, with 25.7% under the age of 18, 7.9% from 18 to 24, 26.7% from 25 to 44, 20.4% from 45 to 64, and 19.3% who were 65 years of age or older.  The median age was 38 years. For every 100 females, there were 92.3 males.  For every 100 females age 18 and over, there were 89.7 males.

The median income for a household in the city was $30,824, and the median income for a family was $39,598. Males had a median income of $27,917 versus $18,512 for females. The per capita income for the city was $14,912.  About 8.6% of families and 14.4% of the population were below the poverty line, including 17.1% of those under age 18 and 16.6% of those age 65 or over.

Notable people
John "Tree" Adams, former American football offensive tackle with the Washington Redskins from 1945-1949
Betty Bumpers, politician
Dale Bumpers, governor of Arkansas and U.S. senator from Arkansas
DeRosey Caroll Cabell, Army General
Paula Casey, United States Attorney
Steve Cox, former American football punter and placekicker and Super Bowl winner with the Washington Redskins in Super Bowl XXII
Otis Davis, baseball player for the Brooklyn Dodgers
Denny Flynn, bull rider
Sunny Jones, former Residents' Interhall Congress Director of Sustainability at University of Arkansas
Francis Irby Gwaltney, author
Gary Stubblefield, farmer, politician
Jesse G. Vincent, aircraft, marine, and automobile engine designer
Larry Lester, historian, author, and co-founder of Negro League Baseball Museum

Education

Public education 
The Charleston School District provides public education from kindergarten through grade 12 from its three facilities, Charleston High School (grades 9–12), Charleston Elementary School (grades K–4), and Charleston Middle School (grades 5–8).

The Public School District of Charleston, Arkansas was the first school district to integrate in the former Confederate States of America. The high school was destroyed in middle 2010 to make way for a larger middle school. There is currently a small monument to the integration in front of Charleston Middle School.

References

Cities in Arkansas
Cities in Franklin County, Arkansas
County seats in Arkansas
Fort Smith metropolitan area
Populated places established in 1870
1870 establishments in Arkansas